Kate Evelyn Isitt (20 July 1876 – 24 January 1948) was a New Zealand journalist and writer.

Biography
Isitt was born in New Plymouth, New Zealand, on 20 July 1876, to Francis Whitmore Isitt and Mary Campbell Isitt (née Purdie). Her father was a Wesleyan minister and the family moved around the country for a number of years. She completed her secondary schooling at Nelson College for Girls in 1891.

She worked for her uncle, Member of Parliament and leader of the prohibition movement Leonard Isitt, in Wellington in the early 1900s as his private secretary. Isitt later wrote a novel based on the development of the Prohibition movement, Patmos, which was published in 1905 under the pseudonym Kathleen Inglewood.

From 1907 to 1910 Isitt was a reporter for the Wellington newspaper The Dominion and its first women's page editor. Under the name "Dominica" she wrote a regular feature titled "Women's World – Matters of Interest from Far and Near". She also founded the Wellington Pioneer Club for women.

In 1910 Isitt travelled to England and came into contact with other expatriate writers such as Dora Wilcox and Edith Searle Grossmann. She continued to work as a journalist as London correspondent for the Manchester Guardian newspaper. She wrote for the newspaper until her retirement in 1944.

Isitt died in Kensington, London, in 1948.

References

1876 births
1948 deaths
People from New Plymouth
20th-century New Zealand novelists
20th-century New Zealand journalists
People educated at Nelson College for Girls
New Zealand emigrants to the United Kingdom
The Guardian journalists
20th-century New Zealand women writers
Women's page journalists
Isitt–Caverhill family